The Campbellton–Moncton train was a daily Canadian passenger train service operated by Via Rail between Campbellton and Moncton, New Brunswick. Intermediate stops were in Charlo, Jacquet River, Petit-Rocher, Bathurst, Newcastle, and Rogersville.

The service was established in 1979 to supplement the Ocean following the cancellation of the Scotian. It was discontinued in 1990.

History

The Canadian National Railway historically operated two daily trains between Montreal and Halifax via Mont-Joli, Campbellton, and Moncton: the Ocean and the Scotian.

On October 28, 1979, the Scotian was discontinued in favor of extending the Atlantic, a former Canadian Pacific train, from Saint John to Halifax. To ensure twice-daily train service remained between Campbellton and Moncton, an unnamed round-trip bearing train numbers 617 and 618 was added on that corridor. Similarly in Quebec, the Saint-Laurent was added between Montreal and Mont-Joli.

Service was discontinued on January 15, 1990, during a round of severe cuts to the Via Rail network overseen by Benoît Bouchard due to the 1989 budget. Since then, the long-distance Ocean has remained the only passenger train operating between Campbellton and Moncton.

References

Railway services discontinued in 1990
Former Via Rail routes
Passenger rail transport in New Brunswick